Rakeem Micheal Joseph (born May 23, 2000) is a U.S. Virgin Islands international soccer player who plays as a forward.

Career statistics

International

References

External links
 Rakeem Joseph at CaribbeanFootballDatabase

2000 births
Living people
United States Virgin Islands soccer players
Antigua and Barbuda footballers
United States Virgin Islands international soccer players
Association football forwards